The 33rd PMPC Star Awards for Television will honor the best in Philippine television programming from 2018 until 2019, 
as chosen by the Philippine Movie Press Club. The ceremony will held on October 13, 2019, at the Henry Lee Irwin Theater in Ateneo de Manila University, Quezon City, and will be aired the delayed telecast by ABS-CBN on October 20, 2019. The ceremony was hosted by Kathryn Bernardo, Kim Chiu, Enchong Dee and Robi Domingo.

The nominations were announced by the Press on September 21, 2019.

Winners and Nominees

Winners are listed first and highlighted in bold:

Networks

Programs

Personalities

Special Awards

Ading Fernando Lifetime Achievement Award
Kris Aquino

Excellence in Broadcasting Lifetime Achievement Award
Vicky Morales

German Moreno Power Tandem Award
Edward Barber and Maymay Entrata
Ken Chan and Rita Daniela

Posthumous Award for Television Excellence
Gina Lopez

Posthumous Award as Icon Philippine TV
Eddie Garcia

Celebrity Mom of the Night
Dimples Romana

Celebrity Skin Magical of the Night
Edward Barber (Male)
Dimples Romana (Female)

Frontrow International Celebrity of the Night
Edward Barber (Male)
Ariella Arida (Female)

TV Queens at the Turn of the Millennium
Carla Abellana
Bea Alonzo
Kathryn Bernardo
Kim Chiu
Sunshine Dizon
Heart Evangelista
Angel Locsin
Jennylyn Mercado
Marian Rivera
Maja Salvador
Judy Ann Santos
Liza Soberano

Most major nominations

Most major wins

Performers

References

See also 
PMPC Star Awards for TV
2019 in Philippine television

PMPC Star Awards for Television
2019 in Philippine television